This is a list of Olympic champions in women's water polo since the inaugural official edition in 2000.

Abbreviations

History
Women's water polo became an Olympic sport at the 2000 Sydney Olympics.

As of 2016, women's teams from Europe, North America and Oceania won all five gold medals.

The United States is the most successful country in the women's Olympic water polo tournament, with two Olympic gold medals. The team won two gold in 2012 and 2016, becoming the first water polo team to win two consecutive Olympic gold medals.

The United States women's national team is current Olympic champion.

Legend

  – Debut
  – Champions
  – Olympic winning streak (winning three or more Olympic titles in a row)
  – Hosts

Team statistics

Results

Squads

Olympic and world champions (teams)

The following table is pre-sorted by number of Olympic titles (in descending order), number of world titles (in descending order), name of the team (in ascending order), respectively. Last updated: 8 July 2022.

As of 2019, there are four women's national water polo teams that won gold medals at the Summer Olympics and the World Aquatics Championships.

Legend
 Year* – As host team

Player statistics

Age records
The following tables show the oldest and youngest female Olympic champions in water polo. Last updated: 18 January 2021.

Legend
  – Host team

Multiple gold medalists

The following tables are pre-sorted by year of receiving the last Olympic gold medal (in ascending order), year of receiving the first Olympic gold medal (in ascending order), name of the player (in ascending order), respectively. Last updated: 18 January 2021.

Four female athletes won two Olympic gold medals in water polo.

Legend
 Year* – As host team

Olympic and world champions (players)

The following tables are pre-sorted by number of Olympic titles (in descending order), number of world titles (in descending order), year of receiving the last gold medal (in ascending order), year of receiving the first gold medal (in ascending order), name of the player (in ascending order), respectively. Last updated: 30 March 2021.

As of 2019, there are thirty female athletes who won gold medals in water polo at the Summer Olympics and the World Aquatics Championships.

Legend
 Year* – As host team

Olympic champion families
The following tables are pre-sorted by year of receiving the Olympic gold medal (in ascending order), name of the player (in ascending order), respectively. Last updated: 18 January 2021.

Legend
 Year* – As host team

Coach statistics

Most successful coaches
The following table is pre-sorted by number of Olympic gold medals (in descending order), year of winning the last Olympic gold medal (in ascending order), name of the coach (in ascending order), respectively. Last updated: 18 January 2021.

There is only one coach who led women's national water polo team to win two or more Olympic gold medals.

Adam Krikorian coached the United States women's national team to two consecutive Olympic gold medals in 2012 and 2016.

Legend
 Year* – As host team

Olympic and world champions (coaches)

The following table is pre-sorted by number of Olympic titles (in descending order), number of world titles (in descending order), year of winning the last gold medal (in ascending order), year of winning the first gold medal (in ascending order), name of the coach (in ascending order), respectively. Last updated: 30 March 2021.

As of 2019, there are two head coaches who led women's national teams to win gold medals in water polo at the Summer Olympics and the World Aquatics Championships.

Legend
 Year* – As host team

Champions by tournament

2020 (United States, 3rd title)
 Edition of women's tournament: 6th
 Host city:  Tokyo, Japan
 Number of participating teams: 10
 Competition format: Round-robin pools advanced teams to classification matches
 Champion:  (3rd title, 1st place in preliminary B group

Source: Official Results Books (PDF): 2021

2016 (United States, 2nd title)
* Edition of women's tournament: 5th
 Host city:  Rio de Janeiro, Brazil
 Number of participating teams: 8
 Competition format: Round-robin pools advanced teams to classification matches
 Champion:  (2nd title; 1st place in preliminary B group)

Source: Official Results Books (PDF): 2016 (pp. 142, 148, 158, 168, 176, 184).

 Head coach:  Adam Krikorian (2nd title as head coach)
 Assistant coaches:  Daniel Klatt,  Chris Oeding

Note: Aria Fischer and Makenzie Fischer are sisters.
Sources:
 Official Results Books (PDF): 2016 (p. 219);
 ISHOF.

Abbreviation

 MP – Matches played
 Min – Minutes
 G – Goals
 Sh – Shots
 AS – Assists
 TF – Turnover fouls
 ST – Steals
 BL – Blocked shots
 SP – Sprints
 20S – 20 seconds exclusion
 DE – Double exclusion
 Pen – Penalty
 EX – Exclusion

Source: Official Results Books (PDF): 2016 (p. 218).

2012 (United States, 1st title)
* Edition of women's tournament: 4th
 Host city:  London, United Kingdom
 Number of participating teams: 8
 Competition format: Round-robin pools advanced teams to classification matches
 Champion:  (1st title; 2nd place in preliminary A group)

Source: Official Results Books (PDF): 2012 (pp. 294, 300, 310, 312, 324, 334).

 Head coach:  Adam Krikorian (1st title as head coach)
 Assistant coaches:  Heather Moody,  Daniel Klatt

Note: Jessica Steffens and Maggie Steffens are sisters.
Sources:
 Official Results Books (PDF): 2012 (p. 369);
 ISHOF.

Abbreviation

 MP – Matches played
 Min – Minutes
 G – Goals
 Sh – Shots
 AS – Assists
 TF – Turnover fouls
 ST – Steals
 BL – Blocked shots
 SP – Sprints
 20S – 20 seconds exclusion
 DE – Double exclusion
 Pen – Penalty
 EX – Exclusion

Source: Official Results Books (PDF): 2012 (p. 368).

2008 (Netherlands, 1st title)
* Edition of women's tournament: 3rd
 Host city:  Beijing, China
 Number of participating teams: 8
 Competition format: Round-robin pools advanced teams to classification matches
 Champion:  (1st title; 3rd place in preliminary B group)

Source: Official Results Books (PDF): 2008 (pp. 17, 23, 25, 33, 37, 43).

 Head coach:  Robin van Galen (1st title as head coach)
 Assistant coach:  Ilse Sindorf

Sources:
 Official Results Books (PDF): 2008 (p. 72);
 ISHOF.

Abbreviation

 MP – Matches played
 Min – Minutes
 G – Goals
 Sh – Shots
 AS – Assists
 TF – Turnover fouls
 ST – Steals
 BL – Blocked shots
 SP – Sprints
 20S – 20 seconds exclusion
 Pen – Penalty
 EX – Exclusion

Source: Official Results Books (PDF): 2008 (p. 71).

2004 (Italy, 1st title)

 Edition of women's tournament: 2nd
 Host city:  Athens, Greece
 Number of participating teams: 8
 Competition format: Round-robin pools advanced teams to classification matches
 Champion:  (1st title; 2nd place in preliminary A group)

Source: Official Results Books (PDF): 2004 (pp. 4, 10, 12, 32, 38, 42).

 Head coach:  Pierluigi Formiconi (1st title as head coach)
 Assistant coach:  Mauro Maugeri

Sources:
 Official Results Books (PDF): 2004 (p. 73);
 ISHOF.

Abbreviation

 MP – Matches played
 Min – Minutes
 G – Goals
 Sh – Shots
 AS – Assists
 TF – Turnover fouls
 ST – Steals
 BL – Blocked shots
 SP – Sprints
 20S – 20 seconds exclusion
 Pen – Penalty
 EX – Exclusion

Source: Official Results Books (PDF): 2004 (p. 72).

2000 (Australia, 1st title)
* Edition of women's tournament: 1st
 Host city:  Sydney, Australia
 Number of participating teams: 6
 Competition format: Round-robin pools advanced teams to classification matches
 Champion:  (1st title; 1st place in preliminary A group)

Source: Official Results Books (PDF): 2000 (pp. 103, 106, 108, 111, 115, 119, 121).

 Head coach:  István Görgényi (1st title as head coach)

Note: Bridgette Gusterson and Danielle Woodhouse are sisters; Bronwyn Mayer and Taryn Woods are cousins.
Sources:
 Official Results Books (PDF): 2000 (p. 96);
 Olympedia: 2000 (women's tournament);
 ISHOF.

Abbreviation

 MP – Matches played
 G – Goals
 Sh – Shots
 AS – Assists
 TF – Turnover fouls
 ST – Steals
 BL – Blocked shots
 SP – Sprints
 20S – 20 seconds exclusion
 Pen – Penalty
 EX – Exclusion

Source: Official Results Books (PDF): 2000 (p. 96).

See also
 Water polo at the Summer Olympics

 Lists of Olympic water polo records and statistics
 List of men's Olympic water polo tournament records and statistics
 List of women's Olympic water polo tournament records and statistics
 List of Olympic champions in men's water polo
 National team appearances in the men's Olympic water polo tournament
 National team appearances in the women's Olympic water polo tournament
 List of players who have appeared in multiple men's Olympic water polo tournaments
 List of players who have appeared in multiple women's Olympic water polo tournaments
 List of Olympic medalists in water polo (men)
 List of Olympic medalists in water polo (women)
 List of men's Olympic water polo tournament top goalscorers
 List of women's Olympic water polo tournament top goalscorers
 List of men's Olympic water polo tournament goalkeepers
 List of women's Olympic water polo tournament goalkeepers
 List of Olympic venues in water polo

 List of world champions in men's water polo
 List of world champions in women's water polo

References

Sources

ISHOF

External links
 Olympic water polo – Official website

Women
.Champions, Women
Women's sport-related lists
Water polo-related lists